Henry Maret (4 March 1837 – 5 January 1917) was a French journalist and politician.

Maret was born in Sancerre.  He belonged to the Radical Party. He was a member of the Chamber of Deputies from 1881 to 1906.  He died in Paris, aged 79.

References

1837 births
1917 deaths
People from Cher (department)
Politicians from Centre-Val de Loire
Radical Party (France) politicians
Members of the 3rd Chamber of Deputies of the French Third Republic
Members of the 4th Chamber of Deputies of the French Third Republic
Members of the 5th Chamber of Deputies of the French Third Republic
Members of the 6th Chamber of Deputies of the French Third Republic
Members of the 7th Chamber of Deputies of the French Third Republic
Members of the 8th Chamber of Deputies of the French Third Republic